Sir Robert James Atkins (born 5 February 1946 in London) is a British Conservative politician.  He was the Member of Parliament (MP) for Preston North from 1979 to 1983, and then for South Ribble from 1983 to 1997. He served as Member of the European Parliament (MEP) for the North West England region from 1999 to 2014.

Early life
Atkins was born on 5 February 1946 in London, England. He was educated at Highgate School, then an all-boys private school in Highgate, London.

Political career
Atkins began his political career at a local level. He served as a councillor for the London Borough of Haringey from 1968 to 1977.

After unsuccessfully fighting the new seat of Luton West in February and October 1974, he was elected the Member of Parliament for Preston North from 1979 to 1983, and for South Ribble from 1983 to 1997. From 1984 to 1987 he was President of Conservative Trade Unionists. He was made a member of the Privy Council in 1995 and was a minister in the following positions:

Parliamentary Under-Secretary of State for Trade and Industry (1987 to 1989)
Parliamentary Under-Secretary of State for Transport (1989 to 1990)
Parliamentary Under-Secretary of State for the Environment and Minister for Sport (1990)
Parliamentary Under-Secretary of State for Education and Science and Minister for Sport (1990 to 1992)
Minister of State, Northern Ireland (1992 to 1994)
Minister of State for Environment and Countryside (1994 to 1995)

He later became a Member of the European Parliament for the North West England region in 1999. He was Deputy Leader of the Conservatives in the European Parliament until November 2007 and was Chief Whip there from November 2008 to November 2009.  He was Conservative Spokesman on Industry and External Trade from 2001 to 2004, and was Spokesman on Regional Policy, Transport and Tourism from 1999 to 2001.) He is a member of the Foreign Affairs Committee and the Transport & Tourism Committee. He stood down at the 2014 European Elections.

In 2019, he was elected as a councillor for the Garstang ward of the Borough of Wyre in Lancashire.

Honours
Atkins was knighted in the 1997 Dissolution Honours List in recognition of his service as a Member of Parliament, as Minister of State for Northern Ireland and as Minister of State for the Environment. He is a Freeman of the City of London.

Family 
Atkins is married to Dulcie Mary Atkins (b.1946), who is a fellow Conservative councillor in Wyre, and who served as her husband's personal assistant during his tenure as an MEP.

Their daughter Victoria Atkins was elected at the 2015 general election as the Conservative MP for Louth and Horncastle.

References

External links 
 
Sir Robert Atkins's Home Page
European Parliament Page for Sir Robert Atkins

1946 births
Living people
Conservative Party (UK) MPs for English constituencies
Knights Bachelor
Members of the Privy Council of the United Kingdom
Politicians awarded knighthoods
UK MPs 1979–1983
UK MPs 1983–1987
UK MPs 1987–1992
UK MPs 1992–1997
Politics of Preston
Conservative Party (UK) MEPs
MEPs for England 1999–2004
MEPs for England 2004–2009
MEPs for England 2009–2014
People educated at Highgate School
Northern Ireland Office junior ministers